The Ukrainian Army or Ukrainian Ground Forces are the land force component of the Military of Ukraine.

Ukrainian Army may also refer to:
 Military of Ukraine (since 1991)
 Ukrainian National Army (1945), begun in the Wehrmacht
 Ukrainian Liberation Army (1943–45), in the Wehrmacht
 Ukrainian Insurgent Army (1941–51), of the Organization of Ukrainian Nationalists
 Ukrainian People's Revolutionary Army (1941–43), formerly Polissian Sich, Ukrainian Insurgent Army, under Taras Bulba-Borovets
 Revolutionary Insurgent Army of Ukraine (1918–24), the Anarchist Black Army
 Ukrainian Galician Army (1918–19), of the West Ukrainian National Republic
 Army of the Ukrainian People's Republic (1917–20)
 Sich Riflemen (1917–19)
 Zaporozhian Host (1492–1775), the Cossack Army
 Druzhina (862–15th century), of Kievan Rus’